

Events

Publications

Births
 15 February – Alfred North Whitehead (died 1947)
 27 February — Rudolf Steiner (died 1925)

Deaths

Philosophy
19th-century philosophy
Philosophy by year